Mauro Scoccimarro (30 October 1895 – 2 January 1972) was an Italian economist and communist politician. He was one of the founders of the Italian Communist Party and the minister of finance between 1945 and 1947.

Early life and education
Scoccimarro was born in Udine on 30 October 1895. His father was of Apulian origin and an employee of the railways. 

Scoccimarro graduated from Zanon Technical Institute in Udine in October 1913. He attended Ca' Foscari University of Venice, and graduated with a bachelor's degree in economics and political science in 1922. He involved in World War I and joined socialist party in 1917, but following the party congress in Livorno in 1921 he left the party to establish the Communist Party.

Career
Scoccimarro was among the Italian members of the fourth Comintern meeting held in 1922. In 1923 he was made a member of the Communist Party's secretariat together with Antonio Gramsci and Palmiro Togliatti. The same year the party leader Amadeo Bordiga was arrested, and the Comintern Executive Committee assigned a group of party members to lead the party, including Scoccimarro, Palmiro Togliatti, Egidio Gennari, Angelo Tasca and Umberto Terracini. In the party Scoccimarro was part of the faction led by Antonio Gramsci.

In 1926 Scoccimarro was arrested by the Fascists and was sentenced to 21 years in prison. He was released from the prison in 1937, but sent to the Island of Ponza, and then to the Island of Ventotene where he lived under police surveillance until July 1943 when the rule of Benito Mussolini, fascist leader of Italy, was toppled. Following the liberation of Rome in June 1944 Scoccimarro acted as high commissioner for the expulsion of fascists and was the minister of occupied territories. In the latter capacity he found an opportunity to strengthen the positions of Italian communists in the northern regions of Italy. 

Scoccimarro's next post was the minister of finance which he held between June and December 1945 in the cabinet of Ferruccio Parri and then, between December 1945 and January 1947 in the second cabinet of Alcide De Gasperi. In 1948 Scoccimarro was elected as a senator which he held until 1972. He also served in different posts in the Communist Party. As of 1966 he was the president of the central control committee. In addition from 1958 to 1972 he was vice president of the Senate.

Death
Scoccimarro died in Rome on 2 January 1972.

Views and works
Scoccimarro was part of the Stalinist faction in the Communist Party in the early 1960s.

Scoccimarro was author of the following books in addition to his other writings:

 La Costituente e il rinnovamento nazionale, 1946
 Dottrina marxista e politica comunista, 1946
 Su alcuni aspetti del nostro programma, 1946
 Il secondo dopoguerra, 2 Bände, 1956
 Nuova democrazia, 1958
 Ideologia e politica, 1960
 La crisi in Alto Adige, Roma, Editori Riuniti, 1960.
 Antonio Gramsci, in Trent'anni di storia italiana, 1915-1945. Dall'antifascismo alla Resistenza, Torino, Einaudi, 1961.
 Ideologia marxista e programmazione economica, Roma, Editori Riuniti, 1965.
 Il rinnovamento e il rafforzamento del partito, Roma, Editori Riuniti, 1966.

References

External links

20th-century Italian politicians
1895 births
1972 deaths
Ca' Foscari University of Venice alumni
Finance ministers of Italy
Italian anti-fascists
Italian Communist Party politicians
Italian economists
Italian people of Albanian descent
People from Udine
Bonomi III Cabinet
Italian resistance movement members
Marxian economists
Deputies of Legislature I of Italy
Deputies of Legislature II of Italy
Deputies of Legislature III of Italy
Italian prisoners and detainees
Members of the Italian Senate
Italian Comintern people